Montoro is a city and municipality in the Córdoba Province of southern Spain, in the north-central part of the autonomous community of Andalusia.

Overview
In 2008, the city had an estimated population of 9,895, with 4,897 men and 4,998 women.

Montoro was known as Epora in Roman times, and became an important Moorish fortress in the Middle Ages.

Twin towns
 Antigua Guatemala (Guatemala)
 Rambouillet (France)

See also
List of municipalities in Córdoba

References

External links

Economic and population data 

Municipalities in the Province of Córdoba (Spain)
Roman towns and cities in Spain